Aphanamixis polystachya, the pithraj tree, is a species of tree in the family Meliaceae. It is native to India, Pakistan, Nepal, Bhutan, Bangladesh, Myanmar and Sri Lanka. It is a widely used as a medicinal plant in Ayurveda.

Description
Oil is not edible and can be used as biodiesel and lighting. The very fine wood is used for construction and ship-making. The tree is 20m tall. Leaves are compound, imparipinnate, alternate; oblong-lanceolate, apex acuminate; base asymmetric; with entire margin. Flowers are polygamous and show panicles inflorescence. Fruit is a single seeded pale-reddish subglobose capsule.

Common names
Assamese—
Bengali—
English—rohituka tree
Hindi—, 
Kannada—, 
Khasi—
Kuki—
Malayalam—, 
Manipuri— 
Marathi—
Rongmei—
Sanskrit—, 
Sinhala— 
Tamil—, 
Telugu—,

Chemistry
The fruit shell contains triterpenes, aphanamixin. The bark contains tetranortriterpene, and aphanamixinin. The leaves contain diterpene, alcohol, aphanamixol and β-sitosterol. The seeds yield a limonoid, rohitukin, polystachin and others, an alkaloid, a glycoside and a saponin. A chromone and three flavonoid glycosides have been reported from the roots.

References

polystachya
Flora of tropical Asia
Least concern plants